Tourmaline was an American rock band from, New Jersey. Formed in June 2004, the band consists of Matt Rauch (lead vocals), Ryan Baredes (guitar), and Max Rauch (Drums). They have released two albums. Strange Distress Calls was released in the United States a year after the band's formation on June 21. It was recorded shortly after they formed in the span of ten days.  Three of the members were 15 years of age. The Swindle was recorded in March 2008 with producer Joe Mcgrath and released in the fall of 2008.

History
Strange Distress Calls, their first full-length released on No Milk Records, has sold over 5,500 copies.  The release was well received by many critics getting positive reviews from Absolutepunk.net, Punknews.org, as well as receiving four out of five stars from Allmusic.
The band's first song to gain significant attention was "Blank", which fell into rotation on many college radio stations during the summer of 2005, while they were on tour with Socratic (Drive-Thru Records).  It was also featured on many compilations.
In 2008 Tourmaline released their full-length record "The Swindle" to favorable reviews.

Members
The band consists of:
 Matt Rauch – Songwriter, lead vocals
 Ryan Baredes – Guitar
 Max Rauch – Drums

Discography

LP
Strange Distress Calls – 2005 
The Swindle – 2008 
Wreckage – 2010 (Unreleased)

References

External links
Tourmaline Official Site
Tourmaline MySpace
Tourmaline Purevolume
 

Musical groups established in 2004
Musical groups from New Jersey